HNLMS Bantam (Dutch: Hr.Ms. Bantam) was an ABC-class auxiliary minesweeper (HMV 4) of the Royal Netherlands Navy that was scuttled by her crew during World War II. She was later re-floated and repaired by the Japanese and converted into auxiliary submarine chaser Cha-117 or No. 117 (Japanese: 第百十七號驅潜特務艇).

History
She was launched and completed in 1938 at the Tanjung Priok, Java drydock of Droogdok Maatschappij and named Bantam after the city of Bantam on the Indonesian island of Java. She was one of six ships in her class (Alor, Aroe, Bantam, Bogor, Ceram, and Cheribon), built for the Gouvernementsmarine, the Dutch civil maritime law enforcement force for the Dutch East Indies, as coastal minesweepers. She was requisitioned by the Dutch Navy and set up as auxiliary minesweeper 4. On 2 March 1942, during the Battle of Java, she was scuttled in the harbor of Tandjong Priok.
 
She was raised by the Japanese and converted into submarine chaser No. 117. On 10 August 1943, her conversion was completed and she was commissioned into the Imperial Japanese Navy. She was mostly engaged in escort duties around Java.

References

1938 ships
Ships sunk by American submarines
Ships built in the Dutch East Indies
Maritime incidents in July 1945
Auxiliary ships of the Imperial Japanese Navy
World War II shipwrecks in the Pacific Ocean
Submarine chasers of the Imperial Japanese Navy
Minesweepers of the Royal Netherlands Navy